Cameron Stevenson (born 30 October 1992) is an Australian-born American cricketer who represents the United States cricket team. He is a right-handed batsman and right-arm fast medium bowler.

He made his T20 debut for  Melbourne Renegades against Sydney Sixers on 23 December 2015. He made his List A debut for Tasmania against South Australia on 19 October 2016. He made his first-class debut for Tasmania in the 2016–17 Sheffield Shield season on 4 November 2016.

Stevenson holds a United States passport, and in November 2019, he was named in the United States' squad for the 2019–20 Regional Super50 tournament. On 11 November 2019, he made his debut for the United States, against Guyana.

In December 2019, he was named in the United States' One Day International (ODI) squad for the 2019 United Arab Emirates Tri-Nation Series. He made his ODI debut for the United States, against the United Arab Emirates on 8 December 2019.

In June 2022, Stevenson was named in the USA's Twenty20 International (T20I) squad for the 2022 ICC Men's T20 World Cup Global Qualifier B tournament in Zimbabwe. He made his T20I debut on 12 July 2022, for the USA against Singapore.

References

External links

1992 births
Living people
American cricketers
Australian cricketers
Cricketers from Tasmania
Tasmania cricketers
Melbourne Renegades cricketers
United States One Day International cricketers
United States Twenty20 International cricketers
People educated at Penleigh and Essendon Grammar School
Australian emigrants to the United States
American people of Australian descent